The 2023 Chicago elections will take place in two rounds on February 28, 2023, and April 4, 2023. Elections will be held for Mayor of Chicago, City Clerk of Chicago, City Treasurer of Chicago, all 50 members of the Chicago City Council, and 66 members of the newly-created police District Councils. The elections will be administered by the Chicago Board of Elections.

Mayor 

Incumbent Mayor Lori Lightfoot is eligible to run for re-election, as there are no term limits for the office. Lightfoot is pursuing re-election, and is facing eight challengers: Kam Buckner (member of Illinois House of Representatives), Willie Wilson (businessman and perennial candidate), Roderick Sawyer (member of the Chicago City Council), Sophia King (member of the Chicago City Council), Ja'Mal Green (community activist), Paul Vallas (former CEO of Chicago Public Schools), Brandon Johnson (member of the Cook County Board of Commissioners), and Jesus "Chuy" García (U.S. Representative from Illinois's 4th congressional district).

Candidates who expressed interest but ultimately declined to run include Arne Duncan (former U.S. Secretary of Education), Mike Quigley (U.S. Representative from Illinois's 5th congressional district), and John Catanzara (president of Lodge 7 of the Fraternal Order of Police). News reports suggested the following prospective candidates, who all eventually declined to run: La Shawn Ford (member of Illinois House of Representatives), Stacy Davis Gates, and Melissa Conyears-Ervin.

City Clerk 

Incumbent City Clerk Anna Valencia is running uncontested for a second full term and a third overall term. She was first appointed to office in 2017, and elected outright in 2019.

Results

City Treasurer 

Incumbent City Treasurer Melissa Conyears-Ervin is running uncontested for reelection. She was first elected in 2019.

City Council 

All 50 seats in the City Council are up for election. This will be the first City Council election following redistricting based on the results of the 2020 United States census.

Police District Councils 
Elections will be held for 22 newly-created police district councils, one for each of the city's police districts. The district councils were created by a police reform ordinance passed in July 2021. The councils will have police oversight responsibilities within their district, and council members will nominate 14 candidates for the city-wide Commission for Public Safety and Accountability, from which seven will be selected and confirmed by the mayor and City Council.

References

External links 
Official campaign websites
 Anna M. Valencia (D) for City Clerk

Chicago elections
Municipal elections in Chicago
February 2023 events in the United States
April 2023 events in the United States